Jerry LeVias (born September 5, 1946) is a former American football player.  He played college football at Southern Methodist University (SMU).  He played professionally in the American Football League (AFL) with the Houston Oilers and in the National Football League (NFL) with the Oilers and the San Diego Chargers.  LeVias was the first African-American scholarship athlete and second African-American football player in the Southwest Conference.

Early years 
Born in Beaumont, Texas, LeVias played quarterback for the black Hebert High School there. LeVias was  listed as  5'9" and 177 pounds (he actually measured closer to 5'7" and 140 pounds out of high school) but made up for his size with great speed.

College career 
He was recruited to the Southern Methodist University in the spring of 1965 by Coach Hayden Fry. LeVias had over a hundred scholarship offers, but none from the traditional historically black college football powers he expected to play for (like Grambling, Alcorn St., Southern, Prairie View etc.) He was deemed too small by those schools to be offered a football scholarship. Coach Fry saw in LeVias the character, academic potential, and skill that would be needed to successfully integrate the Southwest Conference. LeVias had to first win over his freshman football teammates, and that became one of his biggest challenges for this civil rights pioneer. His success, on and off the field, led to a highly anticipated varsity debut in 1966 and quickly became one of the most exciting players in the nation on the conference-champion Mustangs. This first campaign on the varsity squad, LeVias led SMU to their first Cotton Bowl appearance since Heisman winner Doak Walker suited up for the Mustangs, almost two decades earlier. LeVias' touchdowns against rivals Texas, Baylor, Texas A&M and TCU saw the Mustangs earn the conference title in often dramatic fashion. Once LeVias demonstrated his ability on and off the field, Darrell Royal, head coach at the conference power Texas, quipped that LeVias no longer looked too small. Speaking with LeVias' high school coach, Royal said, "Well, he didn't sound very big then when you described him, but he looks plenty big to me now."  Texas had passed over LeVias, not only due to his size but because the Longhorns would not integrate their athletic teams until after being named consensus National Champions in 1969. LeVias wore the number 23 (for Psalm 23), which he also wore during his professional career, at his grandmother's insistence.

In an interview with the Houston Chronicle, LeVias called his years at SMU "living hell" due to the abuse he received from opposition players and, to some extent, his own contemporaries and stated that he would read the Serenity Prayer every morning before leaving for the day to get by. At that time, he was one of the few black students at SMU and the city of Dallas itself was still not fully integrated. Despite the unconditional support from Fry, LeVias was still a frequent target and recalled that he once overheard an alumnus telling Fry that he would withdraw his support from the university if Fry continued playing LeVias.

LeVias was three times consensus All-SWC, 1966–68, and All-America as a senior.  He twice led the league in receiving and held every career record when his three varsity seasons ended, including the single game mark for reception yardage (when he caught 8 passes for 213 yards against North Carolina State in 1968.) LeVias ended his career with a TD catch in SMU's scintillating victory over the Oklahoma Sooners in the 1968 Bluebonnet Bowl and followed that as the MVP of the Senior Bowl. On top of these achievements on the field, LeVias was an Academic All-American his senior year.

In his 1987 book, Richard Pennington has told the story of the integration of the Southwest Conference, beginning with John Westbrook at Baylor and Jerry LeVias at Southern Methodist University in 1966.

In 2008, HBO produced a documentary, "Breaking the Huddle: The Integration of College Football" which highlighted Coach Hayden Fry and Jerry LeVias' struggles while they integrated the Southwest Conference. This struggle was placed amongst the context of other efforts across the nation to desegregate college football. The first African American to ever play in a football game in the SWC was John Hill Westbrook from Baylor University on 10 September 1966, vs. Syracuse University. LeVias' first game was a week later on 17 September 1966 vs. Illinois.

Professional career 
LeVias played his first season (1969 with the American Football League's Houston Oilers, where he was selected to the 1969 AFL All-Star Team, then was with the NFL Oilers (1970) and with the NFL San Diego Chargers (1971–1974).

LeVias was an immediate hit with the Oilers, as Sports Illustrated noted in their coverage of the successful pro football rookie class of 1969, featuring the Oiler flanker. LeVias was responsible for almost half of the Oilers' yardage in 1970. The physicality of the pro game wore on LeVias, who famously remarked, "As the season progresses I get lighter, faster and more afraid." Well versed in avoiding the measuring tape as well as bigger defensive players, one scout claimed to have measured LeVias at 5'8" 163. The pro game eventually became unappealing to LeVias, who already prepared for life after football, working for the Conoco oil company and having a partnership in a Houston men's clothing store even while playing.

Post-football 
After his career ended, LeVias became a businessman.  In 1971, he was one of 16 pro footballers given the keys to the city of Beaumont. He was inducted into the Texas Sports Hall of Fame in 1995 and to the College Football Hall of Fame in 2003.

LeVias married to his long-time partner, Janice, in 2009.

He works with the Houston Texans as a Texans Ambassador.

See also 
 List of American Football League players

References

External links
 
 

1946 births
Living people
American football wide receivers
American Football League players
Houston Oilers players
San Diego Chargers players
SMU Mustangs football players
All-American college football players
American Football League All-Star players
College Football Hall of Fame inductees
Sportspeople from Beaumont, Texas
Players of American football from Texas
African-American players of American football
21st-century African-American people
20th-century African-American sportspeople